Sosnovka is a rural locality (a settlement) in Pinezhsky District, Arkhangelsk Oblast, Russia. The population was 1,091  as of 2012. There are 12 streets.

Geography 
Sosnovka is located 128 km southeast of Karpogory (the district's administrative centre) by road. Mamonikha is the nearest rural locality.

References 

Rural localities in Pinezhsky District